The Museum of Geology in Tashkent, Uzbekistan  is a geology museum that shows and represents the wealth of mineral and geological resources in  Uzbekistan, including valuable stones, minerals and archaeological and paleontological findings.

Overview

The Museum of Geology was first established and opened to the public in 1988. However, the history of the museum covers about 75 years of operation of Uzbekistan geological service, which explored various areas of Uzbekistan. The total number of the stands and exhibits at the Museum of Geology is estimated to be more than 50 thousand pieces, but the visitors are shown only about the half of the stands at the museum. The reason for this is that, the other exhibits are from ancient times and they need special supplements to stay on for a long time. The museum is mainly divided into two parts, which are the "Inner Hall" and the stands outside the building in a geological park. The museum has opened 12 halls inside the main building, and they present nine topics including mineralogy, geology, history of Uzbekistan, paleontology, ancient mining, geological studies of the Kitab Reserve and others.

During its existence, the Museum of Geology has had two buildings. The museum used its old building until April 2011, when the government of Uzbekistan gave new building to the Museum of Geology administration.

The halls of the museum are as follows:

Introduction to the geology
Ancient mountain artifacts 
Hall of “Kitab Reserve”
Hall of vertebrates 
Main hall of mineralogy 
Hall of paleontology
Two halls of minerals
Monographic hall
Regional hall
Hall of petrography 
Expedition hall

International agreements
The Museum of Geology cooperates with some companies of the world, in order to enlarge the base of the museum and fill the archive of the museum with many valuable findings. The corporations that are currently cooperating with the Museum of Geology are:

 Japanese National Company, from 8 July 2013
 JOGMEC corporation, from 25 October 2015
 Korean Institute of Geoscience and Mineral Resources, from 24 August 2011
 Mine Reclamation Corporation, from 8 September 2012
 Hanjin D&B, a Korean company, from 26 May 2015

Head
Currently the head of the Museum of Geology in Tashkent is Turmuratov Ilxombay Bekchanovich.

Location
The Museum of Geology is located at 11A T.Shevchenko Street, Mirabad district, Tashkent, Uzbekistan.

See also

State Museum of History of Uzbekistan
The Museum of Health Care of Uzbekistan
The Museum of Communication History in Uzbekistan
Museum of Arts of Uzbekistan
Tashkent Museum of Railway Techniques
State Museum of Nature of Uzbekistan
Tashkent Poly-technical Museum
The Alisher Navoi State Museum of Literature
Museum of Victims of Political Repression in Tashkent
Art Gallery of Uzbekistan
Tashkent Planetarium

References

External links

Brochure about the museum in Russian (accessed 29 March 2016)
Article about the museum in Russian (accessed 29 March 2016)
Brochure about the museum in Russian (accessed 29 March 2016)

1988 establishments in Uzbekistan
Museums established in 1988
Geology museums
Museums in Tashkent